Star FM (102.9 MHz) is a South African community radio station based in Klerksdorp, City of Matlosana, Dr KK District Municipality DC40,(formerly Southern District municipality) named after Kenneth Kaunda the first President of Zambia, one of the four districts of the North West Province of the Republic of South Africa.

Coverage areas 
The Southern District Municipality, which is located 65 km South west of Johannesburg, and borders Gauteng
Potchefstroom
Klerksdorp
Ventersdorp
Maquassi hills
World wide via live streaming

Broadcast languages
Afrikaans
Xhosa
Tswana
North Sotho
English

Broadcast time
24/7

Target audience
LSM Groups 3 - 9
Age Group 18 - 34

Programme format
60% Talk
40% Music

References

External links
 Official Website
 SAARF Website

Community radio stations in South Africa
Mass media in North West (South African province)